The 1997 NCAA Rowing Championships were contested at the first annual NCAA-sanctioned regatta to determine the team national champions of women's collegiate crew in the United States during the 

This year's regatta was held on May 31, 1997 at Lake Natoma near Rancho Cordova, California.

I Varsity Eight results

1V8 Grand and Petite Finals

1V8 Semi-finals
Note: Top 3 to Grand Final; Bottom 3 to Petite Final

1V8 Repechage
Note: Top 3 to Semifinals, next 2 to Petite Finals, Last 2 eliminated

1V8 Heats
Note: Top 3 to semifinals; rest to reps

II Varsity results

2V8 Grand and Petite final

2V8 Repechage
Note: Top 2 to Grand Final, Bottom 2 to Petite Final

2V8 Varsity Eight Heats
Note: Top 2 to Grand Final, Bottom 2 to Repechage

Varsity Four results

1V4 Grand and Petite Finals

1V4 Varsity Four Semi-finals

1V4 Varsity Four Repechages

Confusion about where the Tennessee 4 came from, as they were not listed in the heats. There may be confusion between Temple and Tennessee. Please update if you have more information

1V4 Varsity Four Heats
Note: Top 3 to Semifinals; Bottom 3 to Repechage

See also
List of NCAA rowing programs

References

Women's rowing in the United States
NCAA Rowing Championships
NCAA Rowing Championships
NCAA Rowing Championships